Jochen Mehrdorf (born 14 July 1940) is a German equestrian. He competed in two events at the 1968 Summer Olympics.

References

1940 births
Living people
German male equestrians
Olympic equestrians of West Germany
Equestrians at the 1968 Summer Olympics
Sportspeople from Braunschweig